KSSK (590 kHz) is a commercial AM radio station licensed to Honolulu, Hawaii, and owned by    It simulcasts an adult contemporary radio format with sister station 92.3 KSSK-FM.  For much of November and December, the stations switch to Christmas music, including Hawaiian artists' holiday songs.  The studios and offices are in the Kalihi neighborhood of Honolulu.

KSSK 590 is powered at 7,500 watts, using a non-directional antenna.  The transmitter site is on Dillingham Boulevard near the Kapalama Canal, about a mile from the studios.  KSSK serves as Hawaii's primary AM station entry point for the Emergency Alert System, with KRTR-FM providing PEP capabilities on FM.

Programming 
KSSK-AM-FM use the slogan "Hawaii's Favorite", and Nielsen consistently ranks the pair as Honolulu's most listened-to radio station. The stations are home to the Perry & the Posse" morning show.  The KSSK's jingle melody was adapted from that of WPLJ in New York City.  KSSK-AM-FM used WPLJ's jingle packages until TM Century created a jingle package for KSSK, known as "Big Time Honolulu."

KSSK-AM-FM are also heard on Oceanic Spectrum Cable digital channel 867 for the entire state of Hawaii, via the DishHD satellite TV service in Taiwan, and also USEN's Sound Planet satellite radio service in Japan.

History

KGMB
The station was first authorized in December 1929, with the sequentially issued call sign of KGMB, to the Honolulu Broadcasting Company. It was initially licensed for operation with 500 watts on 1320 kilocycles.  After a short period of testing, it made its debut broadcast on March 15, 1930.  In 1940, KGMB moved to 590 kHz, where it has been ever since. 

Prior to the December 7, 1941 attack on Pearl Harbor, KGMB was asked to broadcast music in order to provide long-range guidance to a flight of Boeing B-17 Flying Fortresses on their way to Hawaii from the mainland. Japanese aircraft used the same transmissions for guidance while approaching the islands to make their bombing runs. During the attack, KGMB dispatched reports to CBS Radio, which in turn were cited on-air by John Charles Daly, who anchored the network's coverage of that day's news.

KSSK
On Valentine's Day, February 14, 1980, the call letters were changed to KSSK, for "Kiss Radio". For many years, the station was home to Hal "J. Akuhead Pupule" Lewis, better known as Aku. After his death in 1983, the station moved afternoon personality Michael W. Perry to the morning slot and paired him with morning show substitute (while Aku was ill) Larry Price, a former National Football League player and head coach of the University of Hawaii Rainbow Warriors football team. The duo were known as "Perry & Price".

In 1993, New-Tex Communications bought both KSSK and FM station KXPW for $7.5 million, and changed the FM station's call letters to KSSK-FM. At the time, KSSK was the market's #1 station and the new owners wanted to capitalize on that success, especially as music listening was shifting to FM. KSSK-FM began simulcasting part of the day with KSSK, including the top-rated "Perry & Price" morning show. Eventually, the simulcast was expanded to a 24-hour operation.

In 2000, Clear Channel Communications acquired KSSK-AM-FM. In 2014, the company was renamed iHeartMedia, Inc.

Notable former on-air staff 

Some notables who have passed through KGMB/KSSK include: 
Earl McDaniel (General Manager credited with putting the station on top)
Hal Aku Lewis (deceased)
George "Granny Goose" Groves
Don Lamons
Dave Lancaster
Susan Cruz (who was actually Noland Cruz though while on air as Susan Cruz, he was never a female impersonator.  The only link to being female was his name that was given to him by the General Manager)
Ruth Ann "Hana Ogi" Ogata
Shawn Sweeny
Cliff Richards (deceased)
Myk Prosatiowell
Mike Murray
Harvey Weinstein (deceased)
Kimo Kahoano
Jim Peters
Jim Collins
Shawnee (Smith)
Noel Grey
Terry Rosati (News)
Terry Rosati
Alan Zukercorn
Wild Bill Logan
Steve Carpenter
Michael Shishido
Maxwell the night guy (kris sereno)
Erika Engle (news)
Dave Curtis (news)
Maureen Borromeo (Pescaia)-(news)
Brad Barrett, Director of Programming
Dick Wainwright
Denny McPhee
Jim Erickson
Lisa D
Steve Kelly
Jim Parker
Skip Baszler

References

External links
KSSK FM92.3 and AM590 website

FCC History Cards for KSKK (covering KGMB / KSSK from 1929-1981)
Perry and Price

SSK
Mainstream adult contemporary radio stations in the United States
Radio stations established in 1930
IHeartMedia radio stations
1930 establishments in Hawaii